Civic Response (Hungarian: Polgári Válasz) is a Hungarian centre-right to right-wing, civic conservative political party founded in 2020 by , an independent MP.

Ideology

The party wants to create a society based on civic virtues. They cherish Hungary's Christian cultural heritage, the nation and the family  as a fundamental social institution. Instead of a nanny state, they emphasize individual responsibility and civic autonomy. The party also aims to create a strong middle-class. They also stand for freedom of speech and academic and artistic liberty. Their political creed focuses on community service and moral renewal as well.

History

János Bencsik, a former Jobbik MP, founded the Civic Response on 4 December 2020, because Jobbik joined the electoral coalition of the left-wing opposition parties. On February 21, 2021, another MP Tamás Sneider joined the Civic Response. Currently, the party has several County Assembly members, local mayors and councillors.

History of leaders

Electoral results

National Assembly

References

External links

Political parties in Hungary
Political parties established in 2020
2020 establishments in Hungary
Conservative parties in Hungary
Christian democratic parties in Hungary
Jobbik breakaway groups
Opposition to Viktor Orbán